Khatchig Babikian (1924–1999) was a philanthropist, attorney, a Lebanese politician of Armenian origin, and a former member of the Lebanese Parliament (1957–1999) and Lebanese government minister on many occasions as minister of Health, Tourism, Information, Planning, Foreign Affairs, and Justice.

Biography 

Born in Larnaca, on the island of Cyprus, he studied in France, Lebanon, and Italy. A perfect polyglot, he spoke Arabic, Italian, French, Armenian, Turkish, English, and Latin. He was imprisoned in 1940 in a concentration camp in Italy, where he finished his baccalaureate. He later obtained his law degree from the Saint-Joseph University of Beirut.

He became one of the most brilliant lawyers and most eloquent of his generation, always supported by the Tashnag party Dashnak (Tachnag) in Lebanon.

Babikian was elected  and appointed Armenian orthodox of Beirut in 1957 and remained a member of the Parliament until the date of his death in 1999. He was replaced by André Tabourian. He was a minister of State to the administrative Reform (1960–1961), of Health (1969), of Tourism, of Information (1972–1973, government Saëb Salam), of the Plan and the Foreign Affairs (1973, government Hafez Amine) and of Justice (1980–1982, government Chafic Wazzan and 1990–1992).

Khatchig Babikian Fund
The Khatchig Babikian Fund was created in January 2007 by the five daughters of the late Khatchig Babikian (1925–1999). The fund honors the memory of Mr. Babikian, a philanthropist, attorney, former member of the Lebanese Parliament (1957–1999), cabinet minister successively of Administrative Reform, Health, Tourism, Information, and Justice in the Lebanon government, and former chairman of the executive council of the Armenian Catholicosate of Cilicia — Antelias, Lebanon.

The fund is to contribute to the welfare of Lebanese Armenians in particular, and Armenians in general. It was the will of Babikian to establish such a charitable fund to benefit Armenians in humanitarian, educational and cultural projects.

References

People from Larnaca
Cypriot people of Armenian descent
Cypriot emigrants to Lebanon
Lebanese people of Armenian descent
1924 births
1999 deaths
Tourism ministers of Lebanon
Members of the Parliament of Lebanon
Saint Joseph University alumni
Information ministers of Lebanon
Health ministers of Lebanon
Justice ministers of Lebanon
Foreign ministers of Lebanon